Anhalt-Bernburg was a principality  of the Holy Roman Empire and a duchy of the German Confederation ruled by the House of Ascania with its residence at Bernburg in present-day Saxony-Anhalt. It emerged as a subdivision from the Principality of Anhalt from 1252 until 1468, when it fell to the Ascanian principality of Anhalt-Dessau. Recreated in 1603, Anhalt-Bernburg finally merged into the re-unified Duchy of Anhalt upon the extinction of the line in 1863.

History

It was created in 1252, when the Principality of Anhalt was partitioned among the sons of Henry I into Anhalt-Aschersleben, Anhalt-Bernburg and Anhalt-Zerbst. Bernburg was allotted to Henry's second son Bernhard I. When the line of Anhalt-Aschersleben became extinct in 1315, Prince Bernhard II of Anhalt-Bernburg claimed their territory, he could however not prevail against his cousin Albert, Bishop of Halberstadt.

After the ruling family became extinct upon the death of Prince Bernhard VI in 1468, Anhalt-Bernburg was inherited by Prince George I of Anhalt-Dessau. With Anhalt-Dessau it was inherited by Prince Joachim Ernest of Anhalt-Zerbst in 1561, who unified all Anhalt lands under his rule in 1570.

Re-united Anhalt was again divided in 1603 among Prince Joachim Ernest's sons into the lines of Anhalt-Dessau, Anhalt-Köthen, Anhalt-Plötzkau, Anhalt-Bernburg and Anhalt-Zerbst. His second son Prince Christian I took his residence at Bernburg. Christian's younger son Frederick established the separate Principality of Anhalt-Harzgerode in 1635, which existed until 1709. Prince Victor Amadeus of Anhalt-Bernburg inherited Anhalt-Plötzkau in 1665. Upon his death in 1718 his lands were further divided and the Principality of Anhalt-Zeitz-Hoym was created for his second son Lebrecht, which was reunited with Anhalt-Bernburg in 1812.

In 1803 Prince Alexius Frederick Christian of Anhalt-Bernburg was elevated to the rank of a duke by Emperor Francis II of Habsburg. His son Duke Alexander Karl however died without issue in 1863, whereafter Anhalt-Bernburg was inherited by Leopold IV, Duke of Anhalt-Dessau, re-uniting all Anhalt lands under his rule.

Princes of Anhalt-Bernburg, 1252–1468
 1252–1287 Bernhard I
 1287–1291 John I, son, co-regent with his brother
 1287–1323 Bernhard II
 1323–1348 Bernhard III, son of Bernhard II
 1348–1354 Bernhard IV, son
 1354–1374 Henry IV, brother
 1374–1404 Otto III, brother
 1404–1420 Bernhard V, son of Henry IV, co-regent with his cousin
 1404–1415 Otto IV, son of Otto III
 1420–1468 Bernhard VI, brother of Otto IV, left no male heirs
 To Anhalt-Dessau

Princes of Anhalt-Bernburg, 1603–1803
 1603–1630 Christian I, second son of Prince Joachim Ernest of Anhalt
 1630–1656 Christian II, son
 1656–1718 Victor Amadeus, son
 1718–1721 Karl Frederick, son
 1721–1765 Victor Frederick, son
 1765–1796 Frederick Albert, son
 1796–1803 Alexius Frederick Christian, son
 Raised to duchy

Dukes of Anhalt-Bernburg, 1803–1863
 1803–1834 Alexius Frederick Christian
 1834–1863 Alexander Karl, son, died without issue
 To re-united Anhalt

Notes

References
 

1250s establishments in the Holy Roman Empire
1252 establishments in Europe
1863 disestablishments in Europe
States and territories established in 1252
States of the Confederation of the Rhine
States of the German Confederation
House of Ascania
Lists of princes
History of Anhalt
Bernburg
Former states and territories of Saxony-Anhalt
Principalities of the Holy Roman Empire